Osterweil is a surname. Notable people with the surname include:

 Leon J. Osterweil, American computer scientist

See also
 PEN/Joyce Osterweil Award for Poetry, award by PEN America